HHK can mean:

 Happy Hacking Keyboard
 Henry H. Kennedy, Jr. (born 1948), United States District Judge
 Ho-Ho-Kus, New Jersey, United States
 Marching and Cycling Band HHK, a Dutch music association
 Republican Party of Armenia
 Restored Reformed Church, a Christian denomination in the Netherlands
Hybrid Histidine Kinase, a protein in fungal cells